Birdwatch (ISSN 0967-1870) is a British monthly magazine for birdwatchers, established in 1992 by Solo Publishing. Distributed by subscription and also through newsagents, it has a cover price of £4.10. Each edition is also available on iTunes.

Key content areas include bird identification, site guides, skills development, recent sightings and news and reviews.

The circulation is around 13,000.

Solo Publishing was acquired by Warners Group Publications plc in 2008.

References

External links
Website at BirdGuides.com

Journals and magazines relating to birding and ornithology
Ornithology in the United Kingdom
Hobby magazines published in the United Kingdom
Monthly magazines published in the United Kingdom
Wildlife magazines
1992 establishments in the United Kingdom
Magazines established in 1992